Camillo Moro (died 1630) was a Roman Catholic prelate who served as Bishop of Comacchio (1626–1630)
and Bishop of Termoli (1612–1630).

Biography
On 3 December 1612, Camillo Moro was appointed during the papacy of Pope Paul V as Bishop of Termoli.
On 8 December 1612, he was consecrated bishop by Giambattista Leni, Bishop of Ferrara, with Ottavio Ridolfi, Bishop of Ariano, and Ennio Filonardi, Bishop of Ferentino, serving as co-consecrators. 
On 2 March 1626, he was appointed during the papacy of Pope Urban VIII as Bishop of Comacchio.
He served as Bishop of Comacchio until his death on 10 May 1630.

References

External links and additional sources
 (Chronology of Bishops) 
 (Chronology of Bishops) 
 (for Chronology of Bishops) 
 (for Chronology of Bishops) 

17th-century Italian Roman Catholic bishops
Bishops appointed by Pope Paul V
Bishops appointed by Pope Urban VIII
1630 deaths